Jake Wightman (born 11 July 1994) is a British middle-distance runner competing primarily in the 1500 metres. He won the gold medal at the 2022 World Championships, the first global gold in a middle distance event for a British male since Seb Coe's 1500 m title at the 1984 Los Angeles Olympics. At the European Athletics Championships, Wightman earned a bronze in 2018 and a silver for the 800 metres in 2022. He took bronze medal at the 2018 and 2022 Commonwealth Games.

In 2013, Wightman was in his specialist event European Under-20 champion. He holds three Scottish records (800 m, 1000 m, mile), and is a two-time British champion.

Career
As a junior athlete, Jake Wightman was the 2013 European junior champion in the 1500 metres.

In June 2018, he set the Scottish record for the 1000 metres with a time of 2:16.27 at the Diamond League meeting in Stockholm, breaking the previous record which had stood since 1984. That year Wightman became the first Briton to run below 1:45 in the 800 metres and 3:35 in the 1500 m since Peter Elliott in 1991.

The 25-year-old placed fifth in the 1500 m at the 2019 World Athletics Championships held in Doha, Qatar, running 3:31.87 in the final.

At the 2020 Diamond League in Monaco, Wightman broke the Scottish record for the 1500 m with a time of 3:29.47, finishing in third place.

At the postponed 2020 Tokyo Olympics in 2021, he placed 10th in the event in a time of 3:35.09.

2022: World 1500 m champion
Wightman won the gold medal in the 1500 m event at the World Championships in Eugene, Oregon in July with a personal best and world-leading time of 3:29.23, beating reigning Olympic champion and European record holder Jakob Ingebrigtsen (3:29.47). It was the first British world 1500 m title since Steve Cram in 1983, the first Scottish world title on the track since Liz McColgan's 10,000 m gold in 1991, and ended a streak of seven consecutive golds in the event from Kenya-born runners. The mark moved him to third on the UK all-time list. His father, Geoff Wightman, former marathoner and long-time media commentator, called the race as in-stadium commentator.

The 28-year-old continued his good form in August by taking a bronze in his specialist event at the Commonwealth Games Birmingham 2022, and a silver for the 800 m at the European Championships held in Munich.

In September, he broke for the first time the 1:44-barrier in the 800 m and Tom McKean’s 33-year-old Scottish record of 1:43.88, taking his fifth overall Diamond League victory with a time of 1:43.65 in Brussels. He capped his breakthrough season on the road a few days later, winning for the third time the Fifth Avenue Mile in New York (he also won in 2018 and 2021).

Across the season, Wightman set also Scottish records in the 1000 m and one mile, as well as revised his personal bests in the indoor 3000 m and road mile. He was named by Sports Journalists' Association Sportsman of the Year, while British Athletics Writers' Association awarded him John Rodda Award for British Male Athlete of the Year for the second time, among others.

Personal life
Wightman was born in Nottingham, England.

He attended Stewart's Melville College and Fettes College, both independent schools in Edinburgh, before studying at Loughborough University.

His father and trainer Geoff Wightman represented England in the marathon at the 1990 Commonwealth Games in Auckland, whilst his mother Susan Tooby and his aunt Angela Tooby represented Great Britain at the Summer Olympics Seoul 1988.

Achievements

International competitions

Circuit wins, National championships
 Diamond League
 2017 (2): Oslo Bislett Games (1500m), Birmingham Grand Prix (Mile)
 2022 (3): Rabat Meeting International Mohammed VI d'Athlétisme (1500m), Monaco Herculis (1000m,  PB), Brussels Memorial Van Damme (800m, S)
 British Athletics Championships titles
 1500 metres: 2022
 British Indoor Athletics Championships titles
 1500 metres: 2018

Personal bests
 800 metres – 1:43.65 (Brussels 2022) ( Scottish)
 800 metres indoor – 1:47.69 (Glasgow 2018)
 1000 metres – 2:13.88 (Monaco 2022) ( Scottish)
 1000 metres indoor – 2:17.51 (Boston, MA 2020)
 1500 metres – 3:29.23 (Eugene, OR 2022)
 1500 metres indoor – 3:34.48 (New York, NY 2021)
 One Mile – 3:50.30 (Oslo 2022) ( Scottish)
 3000 metres indoor – 7:37.81 (New York, NY 2022)

Awards
 British Athletics Writers' Association
 John Rodda Award for British Male Athlete of the Year: 2020, 2022
 Sports Journalists' Association
 Sportsman of the Year: 2022
 Scottish Athletics
 Athlete of the Year: 2022
 Performer of the Year: 2020 (with Laura Muir and Jemma Reekie)
 Scottish Sports Awards
 Male Athlete of the Year: 2022
 Athletics Weekly
 British Male Athlete of the Year: 2022
 British Milers' Club
 BMC Male Athlete of the Year: 2022

References

External links 

 

1994 births
Living people
People educated at Stewart's Melville College
People educated at Fettes College
Sportspeople from Nottingham
Scottish male middle-distance runners
Athletes (track and field) at the 2014 Commonwealth Games
Athletes (track and field) at the 2018 Commonwealth Games
Alumni of Loughborough University
World Athletics Championships athletes for Great Britain
Commonwealth Games medallists in athletics
Commonwealth Games bronze medallists for Scotland
European Championships (multi-sport event) bronze medalists
European Athletics Championships medalists
Athletes (track and field) at the 2020 Summer Olympics
Olympic athletes of Great Britain
Anglo-Scots
World Athletics Championships winners
Medallists at the 2018 Commonwealth Games